The 2019 New Mexico Lobos football team represented the University of New Mexico in the Mountain Division of the Mountain West Conference (MW) during the 2019 NCAA Division I FBS football season. The team played its games at Dreamstyle Stadium. It was the eighth season under head coach Bob Davie. They finished the season 2–10, 0–8 in Mountain West play to finish in last place in the Mountain Division.

On November 25, Davie and New Mexico agreed to part ways. He finished at New Mexico with an eight-year record of 35–64.

Previous season
The Lobos finished the 2018 season 3–9 overall and 1–7 in Mountain West play for the second straight year as they finished last for the second year in a row and did not qualify for a bowl game.

Preseason

Mountain West media days
The 2019 Mountain West Media days were held on July 23–24 at the Cosmopolitan on the Las Vegas Strip

Media poll
The preseason poll was released at the Mountain West media days on July 23, 2019. The Lobos were predicted to finish in sixth place in the MW Mountain Division.

Schedule

Game summaries

Sam Houston State

Bob Davie experienced heart problems following the victory, forcing him to cancel the post-game press conference. On September 5, run game/offensive line coach Saga Tuitele was named acting head coach.

at Notre Dame

New Mexico State

at Liberty

at San Jose State

Colorado State

at Wyoming

Hawaii

at Nevada

at Boise State

Air Force

Utah State

Notes

References

New Mexico
New Mexico Lobos football seasons
New Mexico Lobos football